Erik R. G. Lundquist (29 April 1896 – 20 August 1961) was a Swedish sport shooter who competed in the 1920 Summer Olympics and in the 1924 Summer Olympics. In 1920 he won the bronze medal as member of the Swedish team in the team clay pigeons competition. He also participated in the individual trap event but his result is unknown. Four years later he finished fifth with the Swedish team in the team clay pigeons competition. In the individual trap event he finished 24th.

References

External links
Erik Lundquist's profile at databaseOlympics

1896 births
1961 deaths
Swedish male sport shooters
Olympic shooters of Sweden
Shooters at the 1920 Summer Olympics
Shooters at the 1924 Summer Olympics
Olympic bronze medalists for Sweden
Trap and double trap shooters
Olympic medalists in shooting
Medalists at the 1920 Summer Olympics
Sport shooters from Stockholm
20th-century Swedish people